Northamptonshire (abbreviated Northants.) is a county in the East Midlands of England. In 2015, it had a population of 723,000. The county is administered by two unitary authorities: North Northamptonshire and West Northamptonshire. It is nicknamed "The Rose of the Shires".

Covering an area of 2,364 square kilometres (913 sq mi), Northamptonshire is landlocked between eight other counties: Cambridgeshire to the east, Bedfordshire to the south-east, Buckinghamshire to the south, Oxfordshire to the south-west, Warwickshire to the west, Leicestershire and Rutland to the north, and Lincolnshire to the north-east—the last being England's shortest administrative county boundary, at 20 yards (19 metres). Northamptonshire is the southernmost county in the East Midlands.

Apart from the county town of Northampton, other major population centres include Kettering, Corby, Wellingborough, Rushden and Daventry. Northamptonshire's county flower is the cowslip. The Soke of Peterborough falls within the historic boundaries of the county, but its area has been part of the ceremonial county of Cambridgeshire since 1974.

History

Much of Northamptonshire's countryside appears to have remained somewhat intractable with regards to early human occupation, resulting in an apparently sparse population and relatively few finds from the Palaeolithic, Mesolithic and Neolithic periods. In about 500 BC the Iron Age was introduced into the area by a continental people in the form of the Hallstatt culture, and over the next century a series of hill-forts were constructed at Arbury Camp, Rainsborough camp, Borough Hill, Castle Dykes, Guilsborough, Irthlingborough, and most notably of all, Hunsbury Hill. There are two more possible hill-forts at Arbury Hill (Badby) and Thenford.

In the 1st century BC, most of what later became Northamptonshire became part of the territory of the Catuvellauni, a Belgic tribe, the Northamptonshire area forming their most northerly possession. The Catuvellauni were in turn conquered by the Romans in 43 AD.

The Roman road of Watling Street passed through the county, and an important Roman settlement, Lactodurum, stood on the site of modern-day Towcester. There were other Roman settlements at Northampton, Kettering and along the Nene Valley near Raunds. A large fort was built at Longthorpe.

After the Romans left, the area eventually became part of the Anglo-Saxon kingdom of Mercia, and Northampton functioned as an administrative centre. The Mercians converted to Christianity in 654 AD with the death of the pagan king Penda. From about 889 the area was conquered by the Danes (as at one point almost all of England was, except for Athelney marsh in Somerset) and became part of the Danelaw – with Watling Street serving as the boundary – until being recaptured by the English under the Wessex king Edward the Elder, son of Alfred the Great, in 917. Northamptonshire was conquered again in 940, this time by the Vikings of York, who devastated the area, only for the county to be retaken by the English in 942. Consequently, it is one of the few counties in England to have both Saxon and Danish town-names and settlements.

The county was first recorded in the Anglo-Saxon Chronicle (1011), as Hamtunscire: the scire (shire) of Hamtun (the homestead). The "North" was added to distinguish Northampton from the other important Hamtun further south: Southampton – though the origins of the two names are in fact different.

Rockingham Castle was built for William the Conqueror and was used as a Royal fortress until Elizabethan times. In 1460, during the Wars of the Roses, the Battle of Northampton took place and King Henry VI was captured. The now-ruined Fotheringhay Castle was used to imprison Mary, Queen of Scots, before her execution.

During the English Civil War, Northamptonshire strongly supported the Parliamentarian cause, and the Royalist forces suffered a crushing defeat at the Battle of Naseby in 1645 in the north of the county. King Charles I was imprisoned at Holdenby House in 1647.

George Washington, the first President of the United States of America, was born into the Washington family who had migrated to America from Northamptonshire in 1656. George Washington's ancestor, Lawrence Washington, was Mayor of Northampton on several occasions and it was he who bought Sulgrave Manor from Henry VIII in 1539. It was George Washington's great-grandfather, John Washington, who emigrated in 1656 from Northamptonshire to Virginia. Before Washington's ancestors moved to Sulgrave, they lived in Warton, Lancashire.

In the 18th and 19th centuries, parts of Northamptonshire and the surrounding area became industrialised. The local specialisation was shoemaking and the leather industry and became one of Britain's major centres for these crafts by the 19th century. In the north of the county a large ironstone quarrying industry developed from 1850.

In 1823 Northamptonshire was said to "[enjoy] a very pure and wholesome air" because of its dryness and distance from the sea. Its livestock were celebrated: "Horned cattle, and other animals, are fed to extraordinary sizes: and many horses of the large black breed are reared."

Nine years later, the county was described as "a county enjoying the reputation of being one of the healthiest and pleasantest parts of England" although the towns were "of small importance" with the exceptions of Peterborough and Northampton. In summer, the county hosted "a great number of wealthy families... country seats and villas are to be seen at every step." Northamptonshire is still referred to as the county of "spires and squires" because of the numbers of stately homes and ancient churches.

Prior to 1901 the ancient hundreds were disused. Northamptonshire was administered as four major divisions: Northern, Eastern, Mid, and Southern. During the 1930s, the town of Corby was established as a major centre of the steel industry. Much of Northamptonshire nevertheless remains rural.

Corby was designated a new town in 1950 and Northampton followed in 1968.  the government is encouraging development in the South Midlands area, including Northamptonshire.

Peterborough
The Soke of Peterborough was historically associated with and considered part of Northamptonshire and the Church of England Diocese that covers Northamptonshire is centred in Peterborough Cathedral. However, Peterborough had its own courts of quarter sessions and, later, county council. In 1965 the administration was merged with that of neighbouring Huntingdonshire. Under the Local Government Act 1972 the city of Peterborough became a district of Cambridgeshire.

Geography

Northamptonshire is a landlocked county located in the southern part of the East Midlands region, which is sometimes known as the South Midlands. The county contains the watershed between the River Severn and The Wash, and several important rivers have their sources in the north-west of the county, including the River Nene, which flows north-eastwards to The Wash, and the "Warwickshire Avon", which flows south-west to the Severn. In 1830, it was boasted that "not a single brook, however insignificant, flows into it from any other district".

There are several towns in the county, Northampton being the largest and most populous. At the time of the 2011 census a population of 691,952 lived in the county, with 212,069 living in Northampton. The table below shows all towns with over 10,000 inhabitants.

As of 2010 there were 16 settlements in Northamptonshire with a town charter:
 Brackley, Burton Latimer, Corby, Daventry, Desborough, Higham Ferrers, Irthlingborough, Kettering, Northampton, Oundle, Raunds, Rothwell, Rushden,  Towcester, Thrapston and Wellingborough.

Climate
Like the rest of the British Isles, Northamptonshire has an oceanic climate (Köppen climate classification). The table below shows the average weather for Northamptonshire from the Moulton weather station.

Governance

Local government

Between 1974 and 2021, Northamptonshire, like most English counties, was divided into a number of local authorities. The seven borough/district councils covered 15 towns and hundreds of villages. The county had a two-tier structure of local government and an elected county council based in Northampton, and was also divided into seven districts each with their own district or borough councils:

Northampton itself is the most populous civil parish in England, and (prior to 2021) was the most populous urban district in England not to be administered as a unitary authority (even though several smaller districts are unitary). During the 1990s local government reform, Northampton Borough Council petitioned strongly for unitary status, which led to fractured relations with the County Council.

The Soke of Peterborough is within the historic county of Northamptonshire, although it had had a separate county council since 1889 and separate courts of quarter sessions before then. The city of Peterborough has been a unitary authority since 1998, but it  forms part of Cambridgeshire for ceremonial purposes.

De facto bankruptcy of the county council
In early 2018, Northamptonshire County Council was declared technically insolvent and would be able to provide only the bare essential services. According to The Guardian the problems were caused by "a reckless half-decade in which it refused to raise council tax to pay for the soaring costs of social care" and "partly due to past failings, the council is now having to make some drastic decisions to reduce services to a core offer." Some observers, such as Simon Edwards of the County Councils Network, added another perspective on the cause of the financial crisis, the United Kingdom government austerity programme: "It is clear that, partly due to past failings, the council is now having to make some drastic decisions to reduce services to a core offer. However, we can’t ignore that some of the underlying causes of the challenges facing Northamptonshire, such as dramatic reductions to council budgets and severe demand for services, mean county authorities across the country face funding pressures of £3.2bn over the next two years."

Structural changes

In early 2018, following the events above, Government-appointed commissioners took over control of the council's affairs. Consequently, the Secretary of State for Housing, Communities and Local Government commissioned an independent report which, in March 2018, proposed structural changes to local government in Northamptonshire. These changes saw the existing county council and district councils abolished and two new unitary authorities created in their place. One authority, West Northamptonshire, consists of the former districts of Daventry, Northampton and South Northamptonshire and the other authority, North Northamptonshire, consists of Corby, East Northamptonshire, Kettering and Wellingborough districts.

National representation
Northamptonshire returns seven Members of Parliament (MPs).  , all are currently from the Conservative Party. Several of the constituencies have been marginal in the past, including the Northampton seats, Wellingborough, Kettering, and Corby, which were all Labour seats before 2005. In the 2016 EU referendum, all of the Northamptonshire districts voted to Leave, most by a significant margin. Two prominent Brexiteer MPs, Philip Hollobone and Peter Bone represent parts of the county.

From 1993 until 2005, Northamptonshire County Council, for which each of the 73 electoral divisions in the county elect a single councillor, had been held by the Labour Party; it had been under no overall control since 1981. The councils of the rural districts – Daventry, East Northamptonshire, and South Northamptonshire – are strongly Conservative, whereas the political composition of the urban districts is more mixed. At the 2003 local elections, Labour lost control of Kettering, Northampton, and Wellingborough, retaining only Corby. Elections for the entire County Council are held every four years – the last were held on 5 May 2005 when control of the County Council changed from the Labour Party to the Conservatives. The County Council uses a leader and cabinet executive system and abolished its area committees in April 2006.

Economy

Historically, Northamptonshire's main industry was manufacturing of boots and shoes. Many of the manufacturers closed down in the Thatcher era which in turn left many county people unemployed. Although R Griggs and Co Ltd, the manufacturer of Dr. Martens, still has its UK base in Wollaston near Wellingborough, the shoe industry has deeply declined as manufacturing has moved away from England. There were over 2,000 shoemakers in the region in the mid 19th century, today the number is over 30 left. Large employers include the breakfast cereal manufacturers Weetabix, in Burton Latimer, the Carlsberg brewery in Northampton, Avon Products, Siemens, Barclaycard, Saxby Bros Ltd and Golden Wonder. In the west of the county is the Daventry International Railfreight Terminal; which is a major rail freight terminal located on the West Coast Main Line near Rugby. Wellingborough also has a smaller railfreight depot on Finedon Road, called Nelisons sidings.

This is a chart of trend of the regional gross value added of Northamptonshire at current basic prices in millions of British Pounds Sterling (correct on 21 December 2005):

The region of Northamptonshire, Oxfordshire and the South Midlands has been described as "Motorsport Valley... a global hub" for the motor sport industry. The Mercedes-AMG and Aston Martin Formula One teams have their bases at Brackley and Silverstone respectively, while Mercedes-Benz High Performance Engines and, formerly, Cosworth, are also in the county at Brixworth and Northampton respectively.

International motor racing takes place at Silverstone Circuit and, formerly, Rockingham Motor Speedway; Santa Pod Raceway is just over the border in Bedfordshire but has a Northamptonshire postcode. A study commissioned by Northamptonshire Enterprise Ltd (NEL) reported that Northamptonshire's motorsport sites attract more than 2.1 million visitors per year who spend a total of more than £131 million within the county.

Milton Keynes and South Midlands Growth area

Northamptonshire forms part of the Milton Keynes and South Midlands Growth area which also includes Milton Keynes, Aylesbury Vale and Bedfordshire. This area has been identified as an area which is due to have tens of thousands additional homes built between 2010 and 2020. In North Northamptonshire (Boroughs of Corby, Kettering, Wellingborough and East Northants), over 52,000 homes are planned or newly built and 47,000 new jobs are also planned. In West Northamptonshire (boroughs of Northampton, Daventry and South Northants), over 48,000 homes are planned or newly built and 37,000 new jobs are planned. To oversee the planned developments, two urban regeneration companies have been created: North Northants Development Company (NNDC) and the West Northamptonshire Development Corporation. The NNDC launched a controversial campaign called North Londonshire to attract people from London to the county. There is also a county-wide tourism campaign with the slogan Northamptonshire, Let yourself grow.

Education

Schools
Northamptonshire County Council previously operated a comprehensive system of state-funded secondary schools. From May 2021 compulsory education in the county is administered by North Northamptonshire Council and West Northamptonshire Council.

The county's music and performing arts trust provides peripatetic music teaching to schools. It also supports 15 local Saturday morning music and performing arts centres around the county and provides a range of county-level music groups.

Colleges
There are seven colleges across the county, with the Tresham College of Further and Higher Education having four campuses in three towns: Corby, Kettering and Wellingborough. Tresham, which was taken over by Bedford College in 2017 due to failed Ofsted inspections, provides further education and offers vocational courses and re-sit GCSEs. It also offers Higher Education options in conjunction with several universities. Other colleges in the county are: Fletton House, Knuston Hall, Moulton College, Northampton College, Northampton New College and The East Northamptonshire College.

University
Northamptonshire has one university, the University of Northampton. It offers courses for needs and interests from foundation and undergraduate level to postgraduate, professional and doctoral qualifications. Subjects include traditional arts, humanities and sciences subjects, as well as entrepreneurship, product design and advertising.

Healthcare

Hospitals
The main acute National Health Service hospitals in Northamptonshire Northampton General Hospital, which also operates Danetre Hospital in Daventry, and Kettering General Hospital.  In the south-west of the county, the towns of  Brackley, Towcester and surrounding villages are serviced by the Horton General Hospital in Banbury in neighbouring Oxfordshire for acute medical needs. A similar arrangement is in place for the town of Oundle and nearby villages, served by Peterborough City Hospital.

In February 2011 a new satellite out-patient centre opened at Nene Park, Irthlingborough to provide over 40,000 appointments a year, as well as a minor injury unit to serve Eastern Northamptonshire.  This was opened to relieve pressure off Kettering General Hospital, and has also replaced the dated Rushden Memorial Clinic which provided at the time about 8,000 appointments a year, when open.

Water contamination
In June 2008, Anglian Water found traces of Cryptosporidium in water supplies of Northamptonshire. The local reservoir at Pitsford was investigated and a European rabbit which had strayed into it, causing the problem, was found. About 250,000 residents were affected; by 14 July 2008, 13 cases of cryptosporidiosis attributed to water in Northampton had been reported. Following the end of the investigation, Anglian Water lifted its boil notice for all affected areas on 4 July 2008. Anglian Water revealed that it would pay up to £30 per household as compensation for customers hit by the water crisis.

Transport

The gap in the hills at Watford Gap meant that many south-east to north-west routes passed through Northamptonshire. Watling Street, a Roman Road which is now part of the A5, passes through here, as did canals, railways and major roads in later years.

Roads
Major national roads, including the M1 motorway (London to Leeds) and the A14 (Rugby to Felixstowe), provide Northamptonshire with transport links both north–south and east–west. The A43 joins the M1 to the M40 motorway, passing through the south of the county to the junction west of Brackley, and the A45 links Northampton with Wellingborough and Peterborough.

The county road network (excluding trunk roads and motorways), managed by West Northamptonshire Council and North Northamptonshire Council, includes the A45 west of the M1 motorway, the A43 between Northampton and the county boundary near Stamford, the A361 between Kilsby and Banbury (Oxon) and all B, C and unclassified roads. Since 2009, these highways have been managed on behalf of the county council by MGWSP, a joint venture between May Gurney and WSP.

Rivers and canals

Two major canals – the Oxford and the Grand Union – join in the county at Braunston.

A branch of the Grand Union Canal connects to the River Nene in Northampton and has been upgraded to a 'wide canal' in places and is known as the Nene Navigation. It is famous for its guillotine locks.

Railways

Two trunk railway routes, the Midland Main Line and the West Coast Main Line, cross the county. At its peak, Northamptonshire had 75 railway stations. It now has only six, at: Northampton and Long Buckby on the West Coast Main Line; Kettering, Wellingborough and Corby on the Midland Main Line; along with King's Sutton, only a few yards from the boundary with Oxfordshire on the Chiltern Main Line.

Before nationalisation of the railways in 1948 and the creation of British Railways, three of the Big Four railway companies operated in Northamptonshire: the London, Midland and Scottish Railway, London and North Eastern Railway and Great Western Railway. Only the Southern Railway was not represented. As of 2019, it is served by Chiltern Railways, East Midlands Railway, Avanti West Coast and West Midlands Trains.

Corby rail history
Corby was described as  the largest town in Britain without a railway station. The railway running through the town from Kettering to Oakham in Rutland was previously used only by freight traffic and occasional diverted passenger trains that did not stop at the station. The line through Corby was once part of a main line to Nottingham through Melton Mowbray, but the stretch between Melton and Nottingham was closed in 1968. In the 1980s, an experimental passenger shuttle service ran between Corby and Kettering but was withdrawn a few years later. On 23 February 2009, a new railway station opened, providing direct hourly access to London St Pancras. Following the opening of Corby Station, Rushden then became the largest town in the United Kingdom without a direct railway station.

Closed lines and stations
Railway services in Northamptonshire were reduced by the Beeching cuts in the 1960s. Closure of the line connecting Northampton to Peterborough by way of Wellingborough, Thrapston, and Oundle left eastern Northamptonshire devoid of railways. Part of this route was reopened in 1977 as the Nene Valley Railway. A section of one of the closed lines, the Northampton to Market Harborough line, is now the Northampton & Lamport heritage railway, while the route as a whole forms a part of the National Cycle Network, as the Brampton Valley Way.

As early as 1897, Northamptonshire would have had its own Channel Tunnel rail link with the creation of the Great Central Railway, which was intended to connect to a tunnel under the English Channel. Although the complete project never came to fruition, the rail link through Northamptonshire was constructed, and had stations at Charwelton, Woodford Halse, Helmdon and Brackley. It became part of the London and North Eastern Railway in 1923 (and of British Railways in 1948) before its closure in 1966.

Future

In June 2009, the Association of Train Operating Companies (ATOC) recommended opening a new station on the former Irchester railway station site for Rushden, Higham Ferrers and Irchester, called Rushden Parkway. Network Rail is electrifying the Midland Main Line north of Bedford, to Kettering and Corby. An open access company has approached Network Rail for services to Oakham in Rutland to London via the county.

The Rushden Historical Transport Society, operators of the Rushden, Higham and Wellingborough Railway,  would like to see the railway fully reopen between Wellingborough and Higham Ferrers.

The route of the planned High Speed 2 railway line (between London and Birmingham) will go through the southern part of the county but without any stations.

Buses
Most buses are operated by Stagecoach Midlands.  Some town area routes have been named the Corby Star, Connect Kettering, Connect Wellingborough and Daventry Dart; the last three of these routes have route designations that include a letter (such as A, D1, W1, W2). Stagecoach's X4 route provides interurban links across the county, running between Northampton, Wellingborough, Kettering, Corby, Oundle and Peterborough.

Airports

Sywell Aerodrome, on the edge of Sywell village, has three grass runways and one concrete all-weather runway. It is, however, only 1000 metres long and therefore cannot be served by passenger jets.

Media

Newspapers
The two main newspapers in the county are the Northamptonshire Evening Telegraph and the Northampton Chronicle & Echo.

Television
BBC regions

Most of Northamptonshire is served by the BBC's East region which is based in Norwich. The regional news television programme, BBC Look East, provides local news across the East of England, Milton Keynes and most of Northamptonshire. An opt-out in Look East covers the west part of the region only, broadcast from Cambridge. This area also is covered by the BBC's The Politics Show: East and Inside Out: East. A small part of the north of the county is covered by BBC East Midlands's regional news BBC East Midlands Today, while a small part of South Northamptonshire is covered by BBC Oxford's regional news BBC Oxford News which is part of the BBC South Today programme.

ITV regions

Most of Northamptonshire is covered by ITV's Anglia region (which broadcasts Anglia Today/Tonight); in the south-west of the county, primarily Brackley and the surrounding villages, broadcasts can be received from the Oxford transmitter which broadcasts ITV Meridian's Meridian Today/Tonight.

Radio
BBC Radio Northampton, broadcasts on two FM frequencies: 104.2 MHz for the south and west of the county (including Northampton and surrounding area) and 103.6 MHz for the north of the county (including Kettering, Wellingborough and Corby). BBC Radio Northampton is situated on Abington Street, Northampton. These services are broadcast from the Moulton Park & Geddington transmitters.

There are three commercial radio stations in the county. The former Kettering and Corby Broadcasting Company (KCBC) station was called Connect Radio (97.2 and 107.4 MHz FM), following a merger with the Wellingborough-based station of the same name. It is now part of Smooth East Midlands. While both Heart East (96.6 MHz FM) and AM station Gold (1557 kHz) air very little local content as they form part of a national network. National digital radio is also available in Northamptonshire, though coverage is limited.

Corby is served by its own dedicated station, Corby Radio (96.3fm), based in the town and focused on local content.

Sport

Rugby union
Northamptonshire has many rugby union clubs. Its premier team Northampton Saints, competes in the Aviva Premiership and won the European championship in 2000 by defeating Munster for the Heineken Cup, 9–8. Saints are based at the 15,249 capacity  Franklin's Gardens ground. In 2014 the club won the Aviva Premiership as well as the Challenge Cup. For the 2014/15 campaign the team finished top of the table for the first time in the premiership, eventually losing 24–29 to Saracens in the playoff semi-final.

Association football
Northamptonshire has twenty four football clubs operating in the top ten levels of the English football league system. The sport in the area is administered by the Northamptonshire Football Association, which is affiliated with the United Counties League, the Northamptonshire Combination Football League, the Northampton Town Football League, as well as the Peterborough and District Football League in neighbouring Cambridgeshire. Only two clubs in Northamptonshire to have competed in The Football League are Northampton Town and the defunct Rushden & Diamonds.

Northampton Town F.C.
The only fully-professional English football league club in the county is Northampton Town, which attracts between 4,000 and 6,000 fans on an average game day and has been part of the Football League since 1920. Their home ground is Sixfields Stadium which opened in 1994. The first match there took place on 15 October against Barnet Football Club. The stadium can hold up to 7,500 people, with provisions for disabled fans.

Other clubs
The county also a number of semi-professional sides that compete in levels 6 to 8 of the football pyramid. These are Kettering Town, Brackley Town, AFC Rushden & Diamonds, and Corby Town F.C. Nineteen teams compete in the United Counties League (UCL), a league operating at levels 9 and 10 of the English League system, and which encompasses all of Northamptonshire and parts of neighbouring counties.

Cricket
Northamptonshire County Cricket Club is in Division Two of the County Championship; the team (also known as The Steelbacks) play their home games at the County Cricket Ground, Northampton. They finished as runners-up in the Championship on four occasions in the period before it split into two divisions.

In 2013 the club won the Friends Life t20, beating Surrey in the final. Appearing in their third final in four years, the Steelbacks beat Durham by four wickets at Edgbaston in 2016 to lift the Natwest t20 Blast trophy for the second time. The club also won the NatWest Trophy on two occasions, and the Benson & Hedges Cup once.

Motor sport
Silverstone is a major motor racing circuit, most notably used for the British Grand Prix. There is also a dedicated radio station for the circuit which broadcasts on 87.7 FM or 1602 MW when events are taking place. However, part of the circuit is across the border in Buckinghamshire. Rockingham Speedway, located near Corby, was one of the largest motor sport venues in the United Kingdom with 52,000 seats until it was closed permanently in 2018 to make way for a logistics hub for the automotive industry, hosting its last race in November of that year. It was a US-style elliptical racing circuit (the largest of its kind outside of the United States), and is used extensively for all kinds of motor racing events. The Santa Pod drag racing circuit, venue for the FIA European Drag Racing Championships, is just across the border in Bedfordshire but has a NN postcode.

Two Formula One teams are based in Northamptonshire, with Mercedes at Brackley and Aston Martin in Silverstone. Aston Martin also have a secondary facility in Brackley, while Mercedes build engines for themselves, Aston Martin, McLaren and Williams at Brixworth. Cosworth, the high-performance engineering company, is based in Northampton.

Swimming and diving
There are seven competitive swimming clubs in the county: Northampton Swimming Club, Wellingborough Amateur Swimming Club, Rushden Swimming Club, Kettering Amateur Swimming Club, Corby Amateur Swimming Club, Daventry Dolphins Swimming Club, and Nene Valley Swimming Club. There is also one diving club: Corby Steel Diving Club. The main pool in the county is Corby East Midlands International Pool, which has an 8-lane 50m swimming pool with a floor that can adjust in depth to provide a 25m pool. The pool is home to the Northamptonshire Amateur Association's County Championships as well as some of the Youth Midland Championships.

Northamptonshire is home to 2016 paralympian Ellie Robinson. She was talent-spotted in July 2012 and developed at Northampton Swimming Club, and was selected to compete for Great Britain at the 2016 IPC Swimming European Championships. She won there three bronze medals, and one silver medal.

Culture

Jane Austen set her 1814 novel Mansfield Park mostly in Northamptonshire.

Melrose Plant, a prominent secondary protagonist in the Richard Jury series of mystery novels by Martha Grimes, resides in Northamptonshire, and much of the action in the books takes place there.

Kinky Boots, the 2005 British-American film and subsequent stage musical adaptation, was based on the true story of a traditional Northamptonshire shoe factory which, to stay afloat, entered the market for fetish footwear.

Rock and pop bands originating in the area have included Bauhaus, Temples, The Departure, New Cassettes, Raging Speedhorn and Defenestration. Richard Coles, an English musician, partnered in the 1980s with Jimmy Somerville to create the band The Communards. They achieved three top ten hits and made the No. 1 in 1986 with a version of the song "Don't Leave Me This Way". In 2012, The University of Northampton awarded Coles an honorary doctorate. From 2011 to 2022 he was the vicar of Finedon in Northamptonshire.

Northampton is the birthplace of composer Malcolm Arnold (born 21 October 1921) and of actor Marc Warren (born 20 March 1967).

Places of interest

Annual events
 Gretton Barn dance
 British Grand Prix at Silverstone
 Burghley Horse Trials
 Crick Boat Show
 Hollowell Steam Rally
 Northampton Balloon Festival
 Rothwell Fair
 Rushden Cavalcade
 St Crispin Street Fair
 Wellingborough Carnival
 World Conker Championships
 Buckby Feast
 Corby Highland Gathering

See also

 Custos Rotulorum of Northamptonshire - list of Keepers of the Rolls
 Grade I listed buildings in Northamptonshire
 High Sheriff of Northamptonshire
 History of Northamptonshire
 List of places in Northamptonshire
 Lord Lieutenant of Northamptonshire
 Northamptonshire (UK Parliament constituency) - historical list of MPs for the Northamptonshire constituency
 Northamptonshire Police
 Northamptonshire Police and Crime Commissioner
 :Category:People from Northamptonshire

Notes

References
 
 .

External links

 Northamptonshire County Council 
 
 1894/5 description 
 Local Theatre in Northamptonshire
 Northamptonshire History Website
 Northamptonshire Tourism Website
 Northamptonshire Guide Website 
 Visit Northamptonshire Website
 Northamptonshire Online Forum
 Images of Northamptonshire at the English Heritage Archive

 
Non-metropolitan counties
East Midlands
Counties of England established in antiquity